Craspedopomatidae is a family of very small land snails with a gill and an operculum, terrestrial gastropod mollusks in the informal group Architaenioglossa belonging to the clade Caenogastropoda (according to the taxonomy of the Gastropoda by Bouchet & Rocroi, 2005).

This family is not to be confused with the family of fossil sea snails with a similar name, Craspedostomatidae.

Genera
Genera in this family include:
 Craspedopoma Pfeiffer, 1847, the type genus
 †Physotrema Sandberger, 1875 (= Bolania)

References 

 Guide to the Systematic Distribution of Mollusca in the British Museum By British Museum (Natural History). Dept. of Zoology, John Edward Gray, British Museum (Natural History), Dept. of Zoology, Published by Printed by the order of the Trustees, 1857

External links 
 Craspedopoma at AnimalBase